Dysgenesis may refer to:

 Dysgenesis (embryology), which indicates abnormal organ development during embryonic growth and development
 Anterior segment dysgenesis, a failure of the normal development of the tissues of the anterior segment of the eye
 "Hybrid dysgenesis", which relates to a high mutation rate in certain Drosophila strains caused by the transposition of P elements
 The study of dysgenics, a theory that deterioration of hereditary qualities can occur in offspring due to survival of or reproduction by less well-adapted individuals